Jordan Township is one of thirteen townships in Jasper County, Indiana, United States. As of the 2010 census, its population was 355 and it contained 144 housing units.

Geography
The stream of Carpenter Creek runs through this township.

Unincorporated towns
 Egypt

Adjacent townships
 Newton Township (north)
 Marion Township (northeast)
 Milroy Township (east)
 Princeton Township, White County (east)
 Carpenter Township (south)
 Grant Township, Newton County (southwest)
 Iroquois Township, Newton County (west)

Cemeteries
The township contains one cemetery, Welsh.

Major highways
  Interstate 65
  U.S. Route 231
  Indiana State Road 16

Education
Jordan Township residents are eligible to obtain a free library card from the Jasper County Public Library.

References
 
 United States Census Bureau cartographic boundary files

External links
 Indiana Township Association
 United Township Association of Indiana

Townships in Jasper County, Indiana
Townships in Indiana